Feeling Electric is the first studio album by electronic rock band Parade of Lights. It was released on June 2, 2015 via Astralwerks.

Track listing

Charts

References

2015 albums